The Burma Office was a British government department created in 1937 to oversee the administration of Burma. The department was headed until 1947 by the Secretary of State for India and Burma, a member of the British cabinet, and then for a few months until January 1948 by the Secretary of State for Burma.

Creation and end of the Burma Office
With the administrative reforms of the Government of India Acts of 1919 and 1935, a tentative devolution of authority to legislative bodies and local governments in South Asia was begun. In 1937, as provided for in the 1935 act, these reforms led to the separation of Burma from India and the creation in London of the Burma Office, constitutionally separate from the India Office, although the two shared the same Secretary of State and were housed in the same building. The new Burma Office came into existence on 1 April 1937.

In August 1947, two newly independent dominions of India and Pakistan resulted from the partition of British India. In September 1947, a constitution to create the Union of Burma , an independent republic outside the Commonwealth, was approved, and in October the Nu-Attlee agreement was signed, granting Burma independence. Thus the Burma Office was dissolved and the last Secretary of State for Burma, William Hare, 5th Earl of Listowel, left the British Cabinet. In the words of the Commonwealth Office Year Book,

Timeline 
1937: Separation of Burma from British India, establishment of the Burma Office
1947: Announcements of imminent independence of India, Pakistan and Burma
15 August 1947: Partition of India into independent India and Pakistan, end of India Office
4 January 1948: Independence of Burma and abolition of Burma Office

Burma Office records 
Unlike other British Government records, the Burma Office records, like those of the India Office, are not in The National Archives at Kew but are deposited with the India Office Records in the British Library, London, where they form part of the Asia, Pacific and Africa Collections. The catalogue is searchable online in the catalogues.

See also 
 Secretary of State for India
 India Office

Notes 

British rule in Burma
Defunct departments of the Government of the United Kingdom
History of Myanmar
Government agencies established in 1937
Government agencies disestablished in 1948
1937 establishments in the United Kingdom
1948 disestablishments in the United Kingdom
Foreign Office during World War II